

See also
 Lists of UK Albums Chart number ones
 Lists of UK Dance Albums Chart number ones
 Lists of UK Independent Albums Chart number ones
 Lists of UK Album Downloads Chart number ones
 Lists of UK Rock & Metal Albums Chart number ones
 Lists of UK R&B Singles Chart number ones

External links
R&B Albums Chart at the Official Charts Company
UK Top 40 RnB Albums at BBC Radio 1